The 1975–76 season was Sport Lisboa e Benfica's 72nd season in existence and the club's 42nd consecutive season in the top flight of Portuguese football, covering the period from 1 July 1975 to 30 June 1976. Benfica competed domestically in the Primeira Divisão and the Taça de Portugal, and participated in the European Cup after winning the previous league.

In the midst of the PREC, Benfica changes managers, with Milorad Pavić leaving for Mário Wilson. In the transfer window, Benfica lost several historic players, notably Eusébio, António Simões, Adolfo Calisto, Artur Jorge and Jaime Graça. With almost no new signings, Benfica campaign started with a home draw against Boavista, which would become his main rival all season. They reached an isolated first place by early October, only to lose after a defeat against Belenenses. Still, they remained in first, ex aequo with other teams, until they drew in Braga and were overtaken by Boavista. Meanwhile, in Europe, the opening rounds of the European Cup saw Benfica defeat Fenerbahçe by 7–1 on aggregate, and Újpesti Dózsa by 6–5 after a tight match in Hungary. In the Primeira Divisão, Benfica lapped the first half of the season with a point less than Boavista. After defeating them on match-day 16, Benfica regained the lead, but only briefly, as they lost it two weeks later, when Leixões beat them. Both teams remained at the front, until Boavista conceded two consecutive losses in March and gave Benfica a four-point lead. Despite that, March also cost Benfica competitions, with the European Cup falling after a 5–1 loss Bayern Munich and the Portuguese Cup to a one-nil loss to Sporting. Benfica won the following matches in April and celebrated their back-to-back league title on 10 May, the club's 22nd.

Season summary
In the aftermath of the Carnation Revolution, the country was experiencing the Processo Revolucionário Em Curso, a troubled time which followed the revolution. The club was experiencing financial problems, with a director saying in a members meet in April 1975, that Benfica could end in two or three months. Milorad Pavić brought the title back to Benfica, but did not wish to continue and departed the club, being replaced by Mário Wilson on 30 May 1975. In the transfer window, Benfica lost two historic club players, Eusébio and António Simões, plus others important players of the past such as Adolfo Calisto, Artur Jorge and Jaime Graça. They also had to sell Humberto Coelho due to the economic situation. The club made almost no new signings, with Romeu Silva and Eduardo Luís being the more noteworthy. Having appointed Fernando Cabrita as his assistant manager, the pre-season began on 22 July. Initially, the training sessions would be in Ferreira do Zêzere, but financial constraints, caused it to be moved to Carcavelos. For preparation, Benfica played in Germany with Borussia Mönchengladbach, competed in the II Troféu Villa de Bilbao with Queen Park Rangers, Real Sociedad and Athletic Bilbao. Afterwards, they embarked on a tour to Australia and Indonesia, playing seven matches in 15 days, before finishing the pre-season on 5 September with Paris Saint-Germain.

Benfica opened their league campaign with a reception to Boavista, where they drew 0–0.  They reacted well and won the next four matches, reaching top of the table with 9 points, one more than Boavista and Braga. Meanwhile, in the opening round of the European Cup, Benfica thrashed Fenerbahçe by winning 7–0 at home, with a one-nil loss in Turkey. Domestically, on match-day 6, Benfica lost 4–2 away with Belenenses and was caught at the lead by four other teams. They followed that loss with three consecutive wins, before a dropping points in Estádio 1º de Maio with Braga. That cost them the first place, as Boavista overtook them, with a point more. In the European Cup, Benfica faced the Hungarian team Újpesti Dózsa, defeating them by 5–2 at home. In the return leg, the Hungarians dominated and reached 3–0 in the second half; even had the opportunity to score the fourth before Nené scored on the 73rd minute to make it 6–5 on aggregate. In December, Benfica won the first three matches, before dropping points with Sporting on the 28. By the New Year, Boavista led the league by a point. In the first match in 1976, Benfica visited Estádio das Antas and beat Porto by 3–2. As Boavista had won in Estádio de Alvalade, they lapped the first half of the season, still in second place. On the opening match of the second half, Benfica visited Estádio do Bessa to play the leaders Boavista, winning 4–1 and assuming the first place with a one-point lead. They would stay at the front only two weeks, because on 26 January, in a match played in Bessa, Benfica lost one-nil with Leixões. They were back in second with 29 points; a point less than Boavista who had won at home.

A week later, it was Boavista turn to lose points and Benfica catch them again in the lead, all level with 31 points. On 16 February, Benfica lost points again with Belenenses, but took advantage of the Boavista's draw with Vitória de Guimarães, to keep the lead, albeit still shared with them. In March, Benfica's opening game was the home leg of the quarter-final of the European Cup with Bayern Munich, with a result being a 0–0 draw. Wilson blamed German goalkeeper Maier for his team's lack of goals. In the Primeira Divisão, on 8 March, Benfica defeated Farense at home by 3–0, while Boavista lost in Antas with Porto. That allowed Benfica to isolate himself in the lead with 38 points, two more than Boavista. A week later, another win for Benfica, away against Estoril Praia, with Boavista losing again, now at home with União de Tomar. They were now with a four-point lead over Boavista with six matches to go. On 17 March, Benfica visited the Olympiastadion to play Bayern Munich. They were thrashed, losing 5–1. According to Wilson, losing a player (Vítor Martins) to injury altered the team strategy, but he also pointed to several mistakes by referee Hilmi Ok that favoured Bayern. Nonetheless, a few days later, he admitted that Benfica's team was enough to play domestically, but insufficient in the European stage. Benfica concluded March with a Portuguese Cup game against Sporting, where they lost one-nil with a goal in overtime. With the league campaign approaching the end, Benfica continued their winning path in April, and secured their back-to-back league title on 10 May with a win in Bonfim against Vitória de Setúbal. It was the club's 22nd in 42 editions. With the title won, in the final two match-days, Benfica won in Alvalade against Sporting and lost at home with Porto. 
 Rui Jordão was the Bola de Prata with 30 goals, one more than Nené, the second leading scorer. Despite winning the title, President Borges Coutinho expressed his desire to have a British manager at the helm, which signalled the departure of Mário Wilson.

Competitions

Overall record

Primeira Divisão

League table

Results by round

Matches

Taça de Portugal

European Cup

First round

Second round

Quarter-final

Friendlies

Player statistics
The squad for the season consisted of the players listed in the tables below, as well as staff member Mário Wilson (manager), Fernando Cabrita (assistant manager).

*

Transfers

In

Out

Out by loan

References

Bibliography
 
 
 

S.L. Benfica seasons
Benfica
Portuguese football championship-winning seasons